Socialist People's Party may refer to:

 National Socialist People's Party of Sweden
 Socialist People's Party (Brazil)
 Socialist People's Party (Denmark)
 Youth of the Socialist People's Party
 Socialist People's Party (Furness)
 Socialist People's Party (Indonesia)
 Socialist People's Party (Norway)
 Socialist People's Party (Serbia)
 Socialist People's Party of Montenegro

See also
 Socialist Party (disambiguation)